The All-Time All Star Award in Hurling was an award given on an annual basis to a sportsperson who had made a long-running and considerable contribution to the sport of hurling in Ireland. In existence from 1980 until 1994 the award was presented to a former player who, more than likely, would have received an All Star had the awards scheme been in existence during their playing days.

List of winners

See also
 All-Time All Star Award (football)

Sources
 Donegan, Des, The Complete Handbook of Gaelic Games (DBA Publications Limited, 2005).

Hurling
Hurling awards